Gigon is a surname. Notable people with the surname include:

 Didier Gigon (born 1968), Swiss former footballer
 Michaela Gigon (born 1977), Austrian mountain bike orienteer and several times world champion
 Michel Gigon (born 1929), French painter, stained-glass window designer
 Norm Gigon (born 1938), Major League Baseball utility player
 Olivier Gigon (born 1979), Swiss professional ice hockey goaltender

See also
 Papilio gigon, butterfly of the family Papilionidae